Marcell Molnár (born 26 August 1990) is a Hungarian football player who currently plays for the austrian club TSU Jeging (Coach Erwin Dankl).

Career statistics

External links
Profile at Soccerway

1990 births
Living people
People from Sátoraljaújhely
Hungarian footballers
Association football forwards
MTK Budapest FC players
BFC Siófok players
BKV Előre SC footballers
Nyíregyháza Spartacus FC players
Mezőkövesdi SE footballers
Veszprém LC footballers
Nemzeti Bajnokság I players
Sportspeople from Borsod-Abaúj-Zemplén County